The Auburndale TECO Trail is a  multi-use path in Auburndale, Florida, United States. The southern terminus of the trail is at Denton Avenue, just east of Berkley Road and directly south of the Lake Myrtle Sports Complex. At the northern terminus, the trail joins the General James A. Van Fleet State Trail in Polk City. Plentiful parking is available at both trailheads. The path is maintained by Polk County in cooperation with TECO Energy, and is sometimes referred to as the Van Fleet Trail extension. Future plans include connecting the trail to the Hilochee Wildlife Management area.

References

Hiking trails in Florida
Rail trails in Florida
Former CSX Transportation lines
Bike paths in Florida
Transportation in Polk County, Florida
Parks in Polk County, Florida
Auburndale, Florida